The Brothers or Mo To Chau (or ) consist of two islands in Hong Kong, Siu Mo To (or East Brother) and Tai Mo To (or West Brother). The two islands have been leveled to avoid affecting aviation of the nearby Hong Kong International Airport. Administratively, they are under the jurisdiction of Tuen Mun District.

Geography
The group of islands lie in the north of Lantau Island, midway between Chek Lap Kok, where Hong Kong International Airport is located, and Tuen Mun. West Brother and East Brother are 550 m by 430 m and 800 m by 180 m respectively. Before being leveled, they had maximum elevations of 68 m and 63 m. Tsz Kan Chau (or Reef Island), a tiny island nearby, is often regarded as a member of the group.

History
Graphite was mined at West Brother Island between 1952 and 1971. By 1964, the mine workings had reached 90 m below sea level.

The two islands were leveled to avoid affecting aviation of the airport. The extracted material was used in the land reclamation of the airport platform. Environmentalists complained that it damaged the habitat of the Chinese white dolphins.

Features
A VOR/DME station is located on Siu Mo To.

Conservation
The Brothers Marine Park was designated as a marine park in December 2016. It encompasses the Brothers islands. The stated aim of the marine park is to help conserve the Chinese white dolphins, their habitats and enhance the marine and fisheries resources therein.

See also

 1908 Hong Kong typhoon
 Urmston Road
 Mining in Hong Kong

References

Uninhabited islands of Hong Kong
Tuen Mun District
Islands of Hong Kong